Kotschya platyphylla is a species of flowering plant in the family Fabaceae. It is found only in Tanzania.

References

Dalbergieae
Flora of Tanzania
Vulnerable plants
Taxonomy articles created by Polbot